Pantanal Futebol Clube, commonly referred to as Pantanal, was a Brazilian football club based in Corumbá, Mato Grosso do Sul.

History
In 1987, the club was founded under the name Ladário Futebol Clube. In 2003, the club was renamed to Ladário Pantanal Futebol Clube, then, in 2004 the club was renamed to Pantanal Futebol Clube.

Stadiums
Pantanal Futebol Clube played in two stadiums, Estádio Arthur Marinho, which has a maximum capacity of 10,000 people and is located in Corumbá, and Estádio Vicente Fortunato, which has a maximum capacity of 3,500 people and is located in Ladário.

References

Defunct football clubs in Mato Grosso do Sul
Association football clubs established in 1987
Association football clubs disestablished in 2018
1987 establishments in Brazil
2018 disestablishments in Brazil